Gert Engels (born 26 April 1957) is a former German footballer. He last coached Nadeshiko League club INAC Kobe Leonessa.

In 2018, Engels received the German Football Ambassador Award for sporting and social commitments abroad. He was succeeded in 2019 by Liverpool manager Jurgen Klopp.

Career 
He commenced his professional playing career with SG Düren 99 and later joined Borussia Mönchengladbach and FC Niederau. In Mönchengladbach he was part of the team that won the German Championships of 1976 and 1977.

Coaching career 
In 1990, he moved to Japan to work as a coach. His first stop was in Ibaraki with Prima Aseno FC, the club that later became Mito HollyHock. He also coached at Takigawa Dai Ni High School in Kobe before he joined the Yokohama Flügels as a member of the coaching staff in 1993.

Shortly before the Flugels folded and were partly absorbed into today's Yokohama F. Marinos - some of the players joined Yokohama Marinos, and the F was added in remembrance of Flugels - he was made manager there for a brief period. He held that position also briefly with JEF United Chiba before taking over the reins at Kyoto Purple Sanga.

In Kyoto he returned the club, that was relegated after the previous season, into the J1 League and even led it to a win in the Japanese cup competition, the Emperor's Cup in 2002, defeating the fancied Kashima Antlers 2-1 in extra time. After three years there he was fired when the club started poorly into the new season.

At the start of 2004 he was assistant coach with Urawa Red Diamonds, initially under head coach Guido Buchwald and later Holger Osieck, winning the AFC Champions League in 2007. When Osieck was sacked after only two matches of the new J.League season on March 16, 2008, Engels was appointed his successor. He was fired by Urawa Reds on 26 November 2008.

Since October 12, 2011, he is the new manager for the Mozambique national team. He ended his time there in 2013.

Managerial statistics

Honors
Emperor's Cup Winner - 1998, 2002
Nadeshiko League Runner-up 2020

References

External links

1957 births
Living people
People from Düren
Sportspeople from Cologne (region)
Borussia Mönchengladbach players
Expatriate football managers in Japan
German expatriate sportspeople in Japan
German footballers
German football managers
J1 League managers
J2 League managers
Yokohama Flügels managers
JEF United Chiba managers
Kyoto Sanga FC managers
Urawa Red Diamonds managers
Mozambique national football team managers
Association football midfielders
Footballers from North Rhine-Westphalia
German expatriate football managers
German expatriate sportspeople in Mozambique
Expatriate football managers in Mozambique